Avelanges is a commune in the Côte-d'Or department in the Bourgogne-Franche-Comté region of eastern France.

The inhabitants of the commune are known as Avelangeais or Avelangeaises.

Geography
Avelanges is located some 45 km north of Dijon and 35 km east by south-east of Aignay-le-Duc. Access to the commune is by the D120 road which branches from the D112 south of Avot in the north and passes through the commune and village before continuing south-west to Marey-sur-Tille. The commune has extensive forests mixed  with smaller areas of farmland.

Neighbouring communes and villages

Toponymy
The name was Arclenglis or Avelengiis in 1028, Avallangiae in 1244, and Avelanges in 1793.

Administration

List of Successive Mayors

Demography

In 2017 the commune had 35 inhabitants.

Avelanges Picture Gallery

See also
Communes of the Côte-d'Or department

References

External links
Avelanges on Géoportail, National Geographic Institute (IGN) website 
Avelanges on the 1750 Cassini Map

Communes of Côte-d'Or